Redtape was one of the East Village zines published between 1980 and 1992. It featured comics, fiction, poetry, graphic art and photography.

History
Redtape was published between 1980 and 1992. The magazine communicated innovative artistic ideas and divided its pages between literature and graphics.  It encouraged the collaboration of writers and visual artists. Michael Carter, the editor and publisher of Redtape, said that the purpose of the magazine was "to explore new possibilities and forms of expression, to develop craft and technique without becoming sequestered in an intellectual or academic ivory tower."  It featured comics, fiction, poetry, graphic art, and photography.  It also provided a venue for both established and emerging artists and writers of the downtown New York scene.

Publications
For the Left Side of Your Brain (1982) 
Assemblage (1982)
Redtape: Double Summer Issue (1983) 
ArtDamaged (1984) 
White Lies ( 1984)
The Cracked Mirror (1986)
Tragicomix (1992)

Contributors to the magazine included Richard Hambleton, Kathy Acker, David Wojnarowicz, Constance De Jong, John Farris, Greer Lankton, Patrick McGrath, Peter Chereches, James Romberger, Lynne Tillman and others.

References

Visual arts magazines published in the United States
Defunct magazines published in the United States
Magazines established in 1980
Magazines disestablished in 1992
Magazines published in New York (state)
Zines